Government Medical College may refer to one of several medical colleges in India:

Jammu & Kashmir 

 Government Medical College, Anantnag
 Government Medical College, Baramulla
 Government Medical College, Doda
 Government Medical College, Jammu
 Government Medical College, Kathua
 Government Medical College, Rajouri
 Government Medical College, Srinagar

Kerala
 Government Medical College, Ernakulam
 Government Medical College, Kannur
 Government Medical College, Kollam
 Government Medical College, Konni
 Government Medical College, Kottayam
 Government Medical College, Kozhikode
 Government Medical College, Manjeri
 Government Medical College, Palakkad
 Government Medical College, Thiruvananthapuram
 Government Medical College, Thrissur

Maharashtra 

 Government Medical College, Akola
 Government Medical College, Aurangabad
 Government Medical College, Baramati
 Government Medical College, Chandrapur
 Government Medical College, Gondia
 Government Medical College, Jalgaon
 Government Medical College, Latur
 Government Medical College, Miraj
 Government Medical College, Nagpur

Rest of India
 Government Medical College, Amritsar
 Government Medical College, Anantapur
 Government Medical College, Azamgarh
 Government Medical College, Banda
 Government Medical College, Bettiah
 Government Medical College, Bhavnagar
 Government Medical College, Chandigarh
 Government Medical College, Haldwani
 Government Medical College, Jalaun
 Government Medical College, Kannauj
 Government Medical College, Kota
 Government Medical College, Mahbubnagar
 Government Medical College, Nizamabad
 Government Medical College, Pali
 Government Medical College, Patiala
 Government Medical College, Raigarh
 Government Medical College, Rajnandgaon
 Government Medical College, Siddipet
 Government Medical College, Srikakulam
 Government Medical College, Surat